The 2013 Torneo Descentralizado de Fútbol Profesional (known as the 2013 Copa Movistar for sponsorship reasons) is the 97th season of the highest division of Association Peruvian football. A total of 16 teams competed in the tournament, with Sporting Cristal as the defending champion. The Torneo Descentralizado began in February and ended in December 2013.

Competition modus
The season was divided into 3 stages. In the first stage 16 teams played a round-robin home-and-away round for a total of 30 matches each. In the second stage the 16 teams were divided into 2 groups. In addition, the team ranked first at the end of the first stage was eligible to play the 2014 Copa Libertadores as Peru 3. Each team carried their records from the first stage into the second stage. Both groups played another round-robin home-and-away round for 14 matches. Bonus points were awarded to two teams based on the performance of their reserve teams in the 2013 Torneo de Promoción y Reserva before the first match of the second stage. The teams ranked first in each group at the end of the 14 matches advanced to the third stage. The two teams with the fewest points at the end of the second stage were relegated. In the third stage the championship was contested in a two-legged Play-off. The Play-off finalists qualified for the Copa Libertadores. The remaining international competition berths were determined by the season aggregate table.

Teams

Personnel and kits

Note: Flags indicate national team as has been defined under FIFA eligibility rules. Players may hold more than one non-FIFA nationality.

First stage

Standings

Results

Second stage
The Second Stage begins on September and concludes November. The winner of each Liguilla will qualify for the group stage of the 2014 Copa Libertadores.

Liguilla A

Standings

Results

Liguilla B

Standings

Results

Play-offs
The Third Stage were the finals (also known as the Play-off) of the 2013 season between the winners of each group of the Second Stage. They were played in December. The group winner with the most points on the aggregate table chose which leg they played as the home team. They also chose the venue of the third match as both teams were tied on points after the second leg.

Tied 4–4 on points. Universitario won 5–4 on penalties.

Aggregate table
The aggregate table will determine the four teams who qualify to the 2014 Copa Sudamericana, one team to the 2014 Copa Libertadores if necessary, and the two teams to be relegated to the Segunda División. The aggregate table consists of the points earned in the First and Second stages.

Relegation play-off
Because Pacífico and Unión Comercio tied with 44 points a relegation play-off on neutral ground will be played as the tournament rules specify.

Union Comercio retained its Torneo Descentralizado spot for the 2014 season. Pacifico was relegated to the 2014 Segunda División.

Top goalscorers
Top goalscorers according to the ADPF.

References

External links
  
Tournament regulations 

2013
1